Input/output completion port (IOCP) is an API for performing multiple simultaneous asynchronous input/output operations in Windows NT versions 3.5 and later, AIX and on Solaris 10 and later. An input/output completion port object is created and associated with a number of sockets or file handles. When I/O services are requested on the object, completion is indicated by a message queued to the I/O completion port. A process requesting I/O services is not notified of completion of the I/O services, but instead checks the I/O completion port's message queue to determine the status of its I/O requests. The I/O completion port manages multiple threads and their concurrency.

See also
Overlapped I/O
kqueue
epoll

References

External links
Article  by Mark Russinovich.
IOCPSOCK - an IOCP implementation of a channel driver for the Tcl language to run on Windows NT/2K/XP/Vista
US6223207B1 - Input/output completion port queue data structures and methods for using same

Events (computing)
Input/output
Microsoft application programming interfaces